London Dial-a-Ride run by Transport for London (TfL) is a door-to-door community transport service for people with a permanent or long term disability or health problem who are unable, or virtually unable to use public transport. In 2019, there were around 40,000 members of the scheme.

History
In December 1972, London Transport began operating a dial a ride service in Hampstead, aimed at both commuters and shoppers. This ended in 1976 due to high costs.

In 1982, Camden Council set up London's first dial a ride scheme for disabled residents, with funding from the Greater London Council (GLC). Several London councils including Greenwich soon followed. Following the successful development of GAD-about in Greenwich, a clone prototype project was developed for London Transport which was then handed over in a modular form to allow easy implementation and scaling up. By the late 1980s, there were over 25 dial a ride groups across London, subsidised by a £7.2m grant from London Regional Transport.
Until 2003, the London Dial-a-Ride service consisted of six sectors, each of which had its own main colour on the Mercedes-Benz Sprinter minibuses:

Fleet
, the fleet comprises 256 accessible vehicles, all VW T6 low floor minibuses. The fleet meets Euro VI emission standards, and therefore is Ultra Low Emission Zone compliant. Historically, a range of vehicles have been used including Mercedes-Benz Sprinter and Vito minibuses.

Taxicard 
The 'Taxicard' scheme provides subsidised taxi and private hire journeys for Londoners with serious mobility or visual issues, with around 60,000 members registered to the scheme. The scheme is run by London Councils.

See also 

Paratransit

References

External links 
London Dial-a-Ride website

Transport organisations based in London
Paratransit services
Transport for London